The Fronsac Lake (French: Lac Fronsac) is a freshwater body located in the unorganized territory of Lac-Pikauba, in the Charlevoix Regional County Municipality, in the administrative region of Capitale-Nationale, in the province of Quebec, in Canada. This body of water is located in the Laurentides Wildlife Reserve.

Lake Fronsac is one of the head water bodies of the Malbaie River. This mountain lake is entirely located in an area where forestry has always been the predominant economic activity. In the middle of the 19th century, recreational tourism activities took off. Due to the altitude, this lake is normally frozen from the end of October to the end of April; however, the safe ice circulation period is usually from early December to April.

Secondary forest roads serve the southern part of the hydrographic side of Lake Fronsac. Another motorable road serves the northern part. The northeast part has no road.

Geography 
Located in a forest zone in the unorganized territory of Lac-Pikauba in the Laurentides Wildlife Reserve, the lake Fronsac is located on the western slope of the Malbaie River valley. The mouth of Fronsac Lake is located on the east side of the lake and is open onto lac à Jack. This mouth is located at:
  west of the mouth of lac à Jack;
  north-west of the mouth of the Lac à Jack outlet (confluence with the Malbaie river);
  north-west of a bay in Malbaie Lake;
  west of downtown Baie-Saint-Paul;
  south-west of La Malbaie town center.

Toponymy 
The term "Fronsac" turns out to be a commune in the southwest of France, located in the department of Gironde. The name appeared on the draft of the Jacques-Cartier Lake map, 1959-11-04, item 81. "Lac à Loutre" is a variant of the official name.

The toponym "Lac Fronsac" was formalized on December 5, 1968 at the Place Names Bank of the Commission de toponymie du Québec.

Related articles 

 Charlevoix Regional County Municipality
 Lac-Pikauba, an unorganized territory
 Laurentides Wildlife Reserve
 Zec des Martres
 Lac à Jack
 Malbaie River

References 

Lakes of Capitale-Nationale
Charlevoix Regional County Municipality
Laurentides Wildlife Reserve